Marquartstein is a municipality in the southeastern part of Bavaria, Germany and is part of the Verwaltungsgemeinschaft Marquartstein and Staudach-Egerndach. It is situated in a region called Chiemgau, approximately 10 km south of Lake Chiemsee between Munich and Salzburg. Most of the area is situated in the valley of the river Tiroler Achen, which separates the village into two parts. Marquartstein is at the edge of the Alps.

Brief history

 1075: the castle was founded
 1803: Pflegamt (municipal jurisdiction) was united with the court in Traunstein
 1857: the castle ruin was rebuilt by Cajetan Freiherr von Tautphoeus
 1884: railway from Übersee was built
 1890-1908 The composer Richard Strauss lived in Marquartstein
 1958 Romanian-American actress Tala Birell was buried in the village
 1978: Marquartstein becomes head of the Verwaltungsgemeinschaft Marquartstein and Staudach-Egerndach

Education

Marquartstein plays an important role in the local education. Almost all major school types are situated in the village:
 the Landschulheim Marquartstein, a Gymnasium (highest-grade secondary school) with a boarding school
 the Achental-Realschule, a medium-level secondary school
 the Pädagogisches Zentrum Schloss Niedernfels (Pedagogic Centre Niedernfels Castle), a private catholic secondary school

References

Traunstein (district)